Lovesick Electric is the debut studio album by American rock band Hot Chelle Rae. It was released by Jive Records on the October 26, 2009. Two singles were released from the album: "I Like to Dance" and "Bleed". The physical copy included a small sticker that said "IL2D".

Track listing

Personnel

Hot Chelle Rae
 Ryan Follese – lead vocals, rhythm guitar
 Nash Overstreet – lead guitar, backing vocals, percussion
 Ian Keaggy – bass, backing vocals
 Jamie Follese – drums, percussion

Additional personnel
 Eric Valentine – percussion, programming
 Matt Erickson – programming
 Matt Radosevich – programming, percussion
 Max Monet – programming
 Butch Walker – percussion, programming
 Chord Overstreet – vocals

References

2009 debut albums
Hot Chelle Rae albums
Jive Records albums